The Kansas City, Kansas High School Gymnasium and Laboratory, at 1017 N. 9th St. in Kansas City, Kansas, was built in 1923.  It was listed on the National Register of Historic Places in 2012.

It was designed by architects William Warren Rose and David B. Peterson of Rose & Peterson.  It has elements of Renaissance Revival style.

References

National Register of Historic Places in Kansas City, Kansas
School buildings completed in 1923
School buildings on the National Register of Historic Places in Kansas
1923 establishments in Kansas